Yeman Jeluq, also known as Eslāmābād, is a village in Ahmadabad Rural District, in the Central District of Nazarabad County, Alborz Province, Iran. At the 2006 census, its population was 210, in 41 families.

References 

Populated places in Nazarabad County